The 2005–06 Bulgarian Hockey League season was the 54th season of the Bulgarian Hockey League, the top level of ice hockey in Bulgaria. Three teams participated in the league, and Akademik Sofia won the championship.

Standings

External links
 Season on hockeyarchives.info

Bulgar
Bulgarian Hockey League seasons
Bulg